ASUSTek Computer Inc. (stylised as ASUSTeK or ASUS) is a Taiwanese multinational computer and phone hardware and electronics company headquartered in Beitou District, Taipei, Taiwan. Its products include desktop computers, laptops, netbooks, mobile phones, networking equipment, monitors, wi-fi routers, projectors, motherboards, graphics cards, optical storage, multimedia products, peripherals, wearables, servers, workstations, and tablet PCs. The company is also an original equipment manufacturer (OEM).

Asus is the world's 5th-largest PC vendor by unit sales as of January 2021. Asus appears in BusinessWeek "InfoTech 100" and "Asia's Top 10 IT Companies" rankings, and it ranked first in the IT Hardware category of the 2008 Taiwan Top 10 Global Brands survey with a total brand value of $1.3 billion.

Asus has a primary listing on the Taiwan Stock Exchange under the ticker code 2357 and formerly had a secondary listing on the London Stock Exchange under the ticker code ASKD.

Name
The company is usually referred to as ASUS or Huáshuò in Chinese (literally "Eminence by the Chinese"). According to the company website, the name Asus originates from Pegasus, the winged horse of Greek mythology. Only the last four letters of the word were used in order to give the name a high position in alphabetical listings.
As its marketing taglines, Asus has used Rock Solid. Heart Touching (2003–2009) and subsequently Inspiring Innovation Persistent Perfection (2009–2013). Since 2013, the company's tagline has been In Search of Incredible.

History
Asus was founded in Taipei in 1989 by T.H. Tung, Ted Hsu, Wayne Hsieh and M.T. Liao, all four having previously worked at Acer as hardware engineers. At this time, Taiwan had yet to establish a leading position in the computer-hardware business. Intel Corporation would supply any new processors to more established companies like IBM first, and Taiwanese companies would have to wait for approximately six months after IBM received their engineering prototypes. According to company history, Asus created a motherboard prototype for using an Intel 486, but it had to do so without access to the actual processor. When Asus approached Intel to request a processor to test it, Intel itself had a problem with its own 486 motherboard. Asus solved Intel's problem and it turned out that Asus' own motherboard worked correctly without the need for further modification. Since then, Asus was receiving Intel engineering samples ahead of its competitors.

In September 2005, Asus released the first PhysX accelerator card. In December 2005, Asus entered the LCD TV market with the TLW32001 model. In January 2006, Asus announced that it would cooperate with Lamborghini to develop the VX laptop series.

On 9 March 2006, Asus was confirmed as one of the manufacturers of the first Microsoft Origami models, together with Samsung and Founder Technology. On 8 August 2006, Asus announced a joint venture with Gigabyte Technology. On 5 June 2007, Asus announced the launch of the Eee PC at COMPUTEX Taipei. On 9 September 2007, Asus indicated support for Blu-ray, announcing the release of a BD-ROM/DVD writer PC drive, BC-1205PT. ASUS subsequently released several Blu-ray based notebooks.

In January 2008, Asus began a major restructuring of its operations, splitting into three independent companies: Asus (focused on applied first-party branded computers and electronics); Pegatron (focused on OEM manufacturing of motherboards and components); and Unihan Corporation (focused on non-PC manufacturing such as cases and molding). In the process of the restructuring, a highly criticized pension-plan restructuring effectively zeroed out the existing pension balances. The company paid out all contributions previously made by employees.

On 9 December 2008, the Open Handset Alliance announced that Asus had become one of 14 new members of the organization. These "new members will either deploy compatible Android devices, contribute significant code to the Android Open-Source Project, or support the ecosystem through products and services that will accelerate the availability of Android-based devices."

On 1 June 2010, Asus spun off Pegatron Corp.

In October 2010, Asus and Garmin announced that they would be ending their smartphone partnership as a result of Garmin deciding to exit the product category. The two companies had produced six Garmin-ASUS branded smartphones over the prior two years.

In December 2010, Asus launched the world's thinnest notebook, the Asus U36, with Intel processor voltage standard (not low voltage) Intel Core i3 or i5 with a thickness of only 19 mm.

In January 2013, Asus officially ended production of its Eee PC series due to declining sales caused by consumers increasingly switching to tablets and Ultrabooks.

Operations 

Asus has its headquarters in Beitou District, Taipei, Taiwan.

, Asus had manufacturing facilities in Taiwan (Taipei, Luzhu, Nangang, Guishan), mainland China (Suzhou, Chongqing), Mexico (Ciudad Juárez) and the Czech Republic (Ostrava).

Asus operates around 50 service sites across 32 countries and has over 400 service partners worldwide.

Products 
Asus' products include 2-in-1s, laptops, tablet computers, desktop computers, smartphones, personal digital assistants (PDAs), servers, computer monitors, motherboards, graphics cards, sound cards, DVD disc drives, computer networking devices, computer cases, computer components and computer cooling systems.

One of Asus main lineup is the Vivo lineup consisting of laptops (VivoBooks), All-in-Ones (Vivo AiO), desktops (VivoPC), Stick PCs (VivoStick), Mini PCs (VivoMini), smartwatches (VivoWatch), computer mouse (VivoMouse) and tablets (VivoTab).

Smartphones 

Asus also launched many Android-based smartphones, predominantly with Intel rather than ARM processors and often with two sim slots. Asus is currently very influential in big mobile markets like India, China, and other Asian countries. It is known as the ZenFone series. Prior to the ZenFone line, Asus has released feature phones such as the Asus v70 and smartphones running on Windows Mobile during the mid-2000s.

First Generation (2014)
 ZenFone 4 (available in either 4-inch or 4.5-inch variant)
 ZenFone 5
 ZenFone 6

Second Generation (2015)
 ZenFone Zoom
 ZenFone C
 ZenFone 2
 ZenFone 2 Laser
 ZenFone Max
 ZenFone Selfie
 ZenFone Go
 ZenFone 2E – made specifically for AT&T and released in 2015

Third Generation (2016)
 ZenFone AR
 ZenFone 3 series

Fourth Generation (2017)
 ZenFone 4 series

Fifth Generation (2018)
 ZenFone 5 series
 ZenFone Max series (M1 and M2)
 ZenFone Live series (L1 and L2)
 ROG Phone series

Sixth Generation (2019)
 ZenFone 6 series
 ROG Phone 2 series

Additionally, Asus also produced some hybrid devices with smartphones that can be docked in a tablet screen, known as Padfone series. The product lineup are:
 PadFone (A66)
 PadFone 2 (A68)
 PadFone Infinity (A80)
 PadFone Infinity Lite (A80C)
 new PadFone Infinity (A86)
 PadFone E (A68M)
 PadFone X (A91)
 PadFone S (PF500KL)
 PadFone Mini (PF400GC)
 PadFone Mini 4.3 (A11)
 PadFone X Mini (PF450CL, US only)

Most of Asus' smartphones are powered by Intel Atom processors with the exceptions of few Padfone series and some ZenFone 2 models that use Qualcomm Snapdragon, though later phones in the series now either use Qualcomm Snapdragon or MediaTek systems on-chip.

Seventh Generation (2020)
 ZenFone 7 series
 ROG Phone 3 series

Eighth Generation (2021)
 ZenFone 8 series
 ROG Phone 5 series

Ninth Generation (2022)
 ROG Phone 6 series

2-in-1s 
Transformer Book
VivoBook Flip
ZenBook Flip
ExpertBook Flip
Chromebook flip

Laptops 
 ZenBook
 VivoBook
 ASUSPRO
 ExpertBook
 ProArt StudioBook
 The Ultimate Force (TUF Gaming)
 Republic Of Gamers (ROG Gaming)
 Chromebook
 EeeBook
 G Series
 N Series
 K Series
 X Series
 E Series
 Q Series
 U Series
 B Series
 V Series
 F Series
 A Series
 T Series

Discontinued series previously offered by Asus includes the EeeBook Series, K Series, X Series, E Series, Q Series, B Series, V Series, P Series, F Series, A Series, u2e Series and G Series.

Tablets 

Two generations of the Nexus 7, manufactured for and branded as Google, were announced on 27 June 2012 for release in July 2012. On 24 July 2013, Asus announced a successor to the Google Nexus 7. Two days later, it was released. Asus has also been working with Microsoft in developing Windows 8 convertible tablets. In 2013, Asus revealed an Android-based tablet computer that, when attached to a keyboard, becomes a Windows 8 device, which it called the Transformer Book Trio. The keyboard can be attached to a third party monitor, creating a desktop-like experience. Asus is also known for the following tablet computer lines:
 Eee Pad Transformer
 Eee Pad Slider
 Eee Slate
 Memo Pad 8
 VivoTab
 ZenPad: 7.0 Z370CG, C 7.0 Z170MG/Z170CG, 8.0 Z380KL, 8.0 Z380C*, S 8.0 Z580CA*, 10 Z300C* (Released 2015); 8.0 Z380M*, Z8 ZT581KL, 3 8.0 Z581KL, 10 Z300M*, 3S 10 Z500M*, Z10 ZT500KL (2016); 3S 8.0 Z582KL, Z8s ZT582KL, 3S 10 Z500KL (2017) (* no SIM)

Asus Server 
GPU Rack Server 
 ESC8000 G3 (Up to 8 GPU high density & hybrid computing)
 ESC4000 G3/G3s

2-Way Rack Server
 RS720Q-E8-RS8-P
 RS720Q-E8-RS12
 RS700-E8-RS8 V2
 RS700-E8-RS4 V2
 RS500-E8-RS4 V2
 RS500-E8-RS4 V2
 RS400-E8-PS2-F
 RS400-E8-PS2
 RS720-E8-RS24-ECP
 RS540-E8-RS36-ECP
 RS520-E8-RS12-E V2
 RS520-E8-RS8-E V2

1-Way Rack Server
 RS300-E9-PS4
 RS300-E9-RS4
 RS200-E9-PS2-F
 RS200-E9-PS2
 RS100-E9-PI2

2-Way Tower Server
 TS700-E8 V3 Series
 TS500-E8-PS4 V2

1-Way Tower Server
 TS300-E9-PS4
 TS100-E9-PI4

Desktop & All-in-One PCs 
 Tower PCs
 VivoPC
 ROG series
 Gaming series

 Mini PCs
 Asus Tinker Board
 VivoMini

 Chrome Devices
 Chromebox
 Chromebit

 All-in-One PCs
 Zen AiO
 Vivo AiO
 Portable AiO

Eee line 
From its launch in October 2007 and until the line was discontinued in January 2013, the Eee PC netbook garnered numerous awards, including Forbes Asia's Product of the Year, Stuff Magazine's Gadget of the Year and Computer of the Year, NBC.com's Best Travel Gadget, Computer Shopper's Best Netbook of 2008, PC Pro's Hardware of the Year, PC World's Best Netbook, and DIME magazine's 2008 Trend Award Winner.

Asus subsequently added several products to its Eee lineup, including:
 EeeBox PC, a compact nettop
 Eee Top, an all-in-one touchscreen computer housed in an LCD monitor enclosure,
 Eee Stick, a plug-and-play wireless controller for the PC platform that translates users' physical hand-motions into corresponding movements onscreen
 Eee Pad Transformer, is a tablet computer that runs the Android operating system.
 Eee Pad Transformer Prime, the successor to the original Transformer.

On 6 March 2009, Asus debuted its Eee Box B202, which PCMag saw as "the desktop equivalent of the ASUS EeePC", (the "Asus Eee Box" computer line was later renamed in 2010 to "ASUS EeeBox PC").

Essentio Series 

Essentio is a line of desktop PCs.  the line consisted of the CG Series (designed for gaming), the CM series (for entertainment and home use) and the CS and CP slimline series.

Digital media receivers 
Asus sells digital media receivers under the name ASUS O!Play.

GPS devices 
Asus produces the R700T GPS device, which incorporates Traffic Message Channel.

Republic of Gamers (ROG) 

Republic of Gamers (ROG) is a brand used by Asus since 2006, encompassing a range of computer hardware, personal computers, peripherals, and accessories oriented primarily toward PC gaming. The line includes both desktops and high-spec laptops such as the Asus ROG Crosshair V Formula-Z Motherboard or the Asus ROG Strix G G731GT AU059T Laptop.

AMD graphics cards were marketed under the Arez brand due to the Nvidia's GeForce Partner Program. However, when the GeForce Partner Program was cancelled, the AMD cards were renamed back to the ROG branding.

In 2013 ASUS launched the RAIDR Express, a PCI express based RAID 0 SSD subsystem with two SSDs on one PCB.

At Computex 2018, Asus unveiled and announced ROG-branded gaming smartphone to compete against ZTE's nubia Red Magic, Xiaomi's Black Shark, and the Razer Phone. The ROG Phone will have a special version of the Snapdragon 845 CPU that can be overclocked, vapor cooling, an external heatsink fan with the USB-C and headphone connectors on its bottom, three different docks, and will be released in Q3 2018.

In March 2021 Asus Launched the ROG Phone 5 Series based on Qualcomm SM8350 Snapdragon 888 (5 nm), Octa-core processor.

In January 2022, Asus announced the ROG Flow Z13 during the ROG's CES 2022 launch event. Equipped with the high-performance Intel's Core i9 processor and Nvidia's GeForce RTX 3050 Ti graphic performance, making the biggest innovation breakthroughs on tablet markets. It is the world's first RTX 30 series computer in tablet form factor.

The Ultimate Force (TUF) 
The Ultimate Force is a brand used by Asus since about 2010. The TUF Gaming brand is for Asus affordable, mid-range gaming products.

Sound cards 
Asus released its first sound card, the Xonar DX, in February 2008. The Xonar DX was able to emulate the EAX 5.0 effects through the ASUS GX software while also supporting Open AL and DTS-connect. In July 2008 ASUS launched the Xonar D1, which offered largely similar features to the Xonar DX but connected to the motherboard through the PCI interface instead of the PCI-E ×1 connection of the Xonar DX. ASUS then released the Xonar HDAV 1.3, which was the first solution enabling loss-less HD audio bit streaming to AV receivers.

In May 2009, Asus launched the Essence ST sound card, targeted at high-end audiophiles, and featuring 124dB SNR rating and precision audio clock tuning. In the same month, Asus refreshed the HDAV family by releasing the HDAV 1.3 slim, a card targeted for HTPC users offering similar functionality to HDAV 1.3 but in a smaller form. During Computex 2010, ASUS introduced its Xonar Xense, an audio bundle composed of the Xense sound card and a special edition of the Sennheiser PC350 headset. In August 2010, ASUS released the Xonar DG sound card targeted at budget buyers and offering 5.1 surround sound support, 105dB SNR rating, support for Dolby headphone and GX 2.5 support for emulating EAX 5.0 technology.

ASUS VivoPC line 
Asus entered the box-PC market with the Vivo PC line in November 2013. ASUS VivoPCs come without a pre-installed Windows operating system.

On 23 October 2013 ASUS launched two models of VivoPCs in India. VivoPC was initially announced with Intel Celeron processor equipped VM40B model. But in India, the company released VivoPC along with a new model called VC60 which is equipped by Intel Core series processors.

Portable monitors 
In 2013, Asus released the MB168B, a USB 3.0-powered, portable external monitor. At the time of its release, the MB168B+ was the only 1080p portable monitor. According to Asus, it is the "world's slimmest and lightest USB monitor".

Desktop monitors 
 ROG Swift PG279Q
 ROG Swift PG348Q
 ROG Swift PG35VQ
 PB27UQ
 MX34VQ
 VZ279Q

Motherboards

Asus motherboards sometimes include a Q-Connector which sits in between the motherboard front panel connectors and the front panel cables. The Q-Connector is marked with bigger text than the front panel connectors on the motherboard, as well as protruding from the motherboard, limiting obstruction from heatsinks and other connectors.

The Q-connector allows the many front-panel connections to be removed as a single unit for maintenance. This greatly reduces the risk of incorrect connections when reassembling.

Other initiatives

Esports 
Asus ROG has been an active advocate for esports, having established some of their very own professional gaming teams.

In January 2021, ROG announced the establishment of a new esports academy in India, with plans to scout and train up professional gamers for the Counter-Strike: Global Offensive (CS: GO) PC game. The initiative will provide shortlisted gamers with coaching, gaming equipment, and stipends to prepare them for competitive esports tournaments on both the national and international levels.

Environmental record

Green ASUS 
In 2000, Asus launched Green ASUS, a company-wide sustainable computing initiative overseen by a steering committee led by Jonney Shih, the Chairman of Asus. According to the company, Asus pursues green policies in "Design, Procurement, Manufacturing, and Marketing."

Recognition 
In 2006, Asus obtained IECQ (IEC Quality Assessment System for Electronic Components) HSPM (Hazardous Substance Process Management) certification for its headquarters and for all of its manufacturing sites.

In 2007, Oekom Research, an independent research institute specialising in corporate responsibility assessment, recognized Asus as a "highly environmental friendly company" in the "Computers, Peripherals and Office Electronics Industry".

In October 2008, Asus received 11 Electronic Product Environmental Assessment Tool (EPEAT) Gold Awards for its products, including four of its N-Series notebooks, namely the N10, N20, N50, and N80. In the following month, it received EU Flower certification for the same N-Series notebooks at an award ceremony held in Prague. In December 2008, Det Norske Veritas conferred the world's first EuP (Energy-using Product) certification for portable notebooks on these machines.

Recycling campaign 
In April 2008, Asus launched its "PC Recycling for a Brighter Future"
program in collaboration with Intel and with Tsann Kuen Enterprise Co. The program collected more than 1,200 desktop computers, notebooks and CRT/LCD monitors, refurbished them and donated them to 122 elementary and junior high schools, five aboriginal communities and the Tzu Chi Stem Cell Center.

Controversies 
In September 2008, PC Pro discovered through a reader that Asus had accidentally shipped laptops that contained cracked and unlicensed software. Both physical machines and recovery CDs contained confidential documents from Microsoft and other organizations, internal Asus documents, and sensitive personal information including CVs. At the time, an Asus spokesperson promised an investigation at "quite a high level", but declined to comment on how the files got on the machines and recovery media. It was demonstrated that an unattended installation of Windows Vista could accidentally copy material from a flash drive with a parameter in the "unattend.xml" file on the personal flash drive being used to script the installation.

In February 2014, a security vulnerability in the AiCloud functions on a number of Asus routers was compromised to distribute a text file warning of a vulnerability, disclosed in June 2013, allowing the ability to "traverse to any external storage plugged in through the USB ports on the back of the router" via the open internet. Before making the vulnerability public, the researcher was told by Asus that the behavior was "not an issue", but the vulnerability was reportedly patched shortly prior to the breach. The IP addresses of 12,937 routers, and 3,131 AiCloud accounts were also leaked by the hackers. The U.S. Federal Trade Commission issued a complaint about the breach for the company's "failure to employ reasonable security practices has subjected consumers to substantial injury", alleging that Asus had also failed to perform basic penetration tests, allowed users to maintain a default admin password for the AiDisk feature and failed to notify users of security updates in a timely fashion. As a result, it was also deemed that Asus had misled consumers over the security and protection that its routers provided. In February 2016, Asus settled the complaint, agreeing to implement a "comprehensive security program", including independent audits every two years for the next 20 years.

In March 2019, Kaspersky Lab researchers disclosed a supply chain attack that affected the Asus Live Update software bundled on its laptops, dubbed ShadowHammer. Kaspersky stated that between June and November 2018, Asus servers had been compromised to distribute a modified version of Live Update, signed with an Asus signature, that contained a backdoor. It deployed a further payload if the device's network adapter matched an entry on an internal target list of around 600 MAC addresses. In response to ShadowHammer, Asus released a patched version of Live Update with improved security measures. Kaspersky and Symantec estimated that between 500,000 and 1 million devices were infected with the backdoor, although Asus attempted to downplay the severity of the breach by noting the extremely targeted nature of the attack. The breach did not affect the similar, identically named software associated with its motherboards.

In April 2019, ESET disclosed that a group known as BlackTech had performed targeted attacks with malware known as Plead, distributed via the updater for the Asus WebStorage service. ESET stated that the group was likely using a man-in-the-middle attack via a vulnerability in routers, in combination with the updater using an unencrypted HTTP connection.

In January 2022, Asus recalled some of its Z690 Maximus Hero motherboards due to a manufacturing flaw, where a RAM capacitor was installed backwards—causing them to burn out associated MOSFETs and prevent the motherboard from detecting memory.

During the Russian invasion of Ukraine in 2022, ASUS initially refused to join the international community and withdraw from the Russian market. In mid-March the company did announce its halting its operations in Russia, following a social media boycott and government pressure.

See also 

 ASRock
 Biostar
 DFI
 Elitegroup Computer Systems
 EVGA Corporation
 Fastra II
 Gigabyte Technology
 Micro-Star International
 List of companies of Taiwan
 List of wireless router firmware projects
 Tomato (firmware)

References

External links 

 

 
Companies based in Taipei
Technology companies established in 1989
Electronics companies established in 1989
1996 initial public offerings
Companies formerly listed on the London Stock Exchange
Companies listed on the Taiwan Stock Exchange
Computer enclosure companies
Display technology companies
Electronics companies of Taiwan
Graphics hardware companies
Mobile phone manufacturers
Motherboard companies
Multinational companies headquartered in Taiwan
Netbook manufacturers
Taiwanese brands
Taiwanese companies established in 1989
Defence companies of Taiwan
Computer power supply unit manufacturers
Computer hardware cooling
Data centers